Call Lake Provincial Park is a provincial park in British Columbia, Canada,  southeast of Smithers, British Columbia, in the Bulkley Valley region. The park was established in 1999, comprising approximately 60 hectares.

References

Provincial parks of British Columbia
Regional District of Bulkley-Nechako
Bulkley Valley
1999 establishments in British Columbia
Protected areas established in 1999